Paul Richard Brass (November 8, 1936 – May 31, 2022) was an American political scientist known for his research on the politics of India. He was professor emeritus of political science and international relations at the Henry M. Jackson School of International Studies, University of Washington, where he taught since 1965. After his B.A. in government in 1958 from Harvard College, he did M.A. in political science, University of Chicago in 1959, followed by Ph.D. in political science, University of Chicago in 1964. 

He was born in Boston, Massachusetts. He attended the Boston Latin School.

He has studied the Indian subcontinent since 1961. He has published numerous books on the politics of India, including The Production of Hindu-Muslim Violence in Contemporary India (2004).

Works

References

External links
 

1936 births
2022 deaths
Harvard College alumni
University of Chicago alumni
American political scientists
University of Washington faculty
American Indologists